Chaim Isaac Waxman (born February 26, 1941) is an American sociologist now living in Israel.

Academic career
Waxman received his  B.A. in sociology from Yeshiva University. He received his M.A. and Ph.D. in sociology from The New School for Social Research. He was a Senior Fellow at the Jewish People Policy Planning Institute in Jerusalem until March 1, 2009.  He is a Professor Emeritus of Sociology and Jewish Studies at Rutgers University.

At the ASSJ
Waxman served as the president of the Association for the Social Scientific Study of Jewry (ASSJ) from 1979 to 1981.

Books
 IGGUD: Selected Essays in Jewish Studies, Vol. 2, History of the Jewish People and Contemporary Jewish Society (Co-Ed. with Gershon Bacon, Albert Baumgarten, Jacob Barnai, and Israel J. Yuval). Jerusalem: World Union of Jewish Studies, 2009.
 Religious Zionism Post Disengagement: Future Directions. New York & Jersey City, NJ: Yeshiva University Press/Ktav Publishing House, 2008.
 Historical Dictionary of Zionism, Second Edition (Co-Author, with Rafael Medoff). Lanham, MD: Scarecrow Press, 2008. Paperback Edition titled, The A to Z of Zionism, 2009.  First Edition, Lanham, MD: Scarecrow Press, 2000.
 Flipping Out? Myth or Fact: The Impact of the “Year in Israel” (Co-Author with Shalom Z. Berger and Daniel Jacobson). New York: Yashar Books, 2007.
 Jews in Israel: Contemporary Social and Cultural Patterns (Co-Ed., with Uzi Rebhun). Hanover: Brandeis University Press/University Press of New England, 2004.
 Jewish Baby Boomers: A Communal Perspective. Albany: State University of New York Press, 2001.
 Jews in America: A Contemporary Reader (Co-Ed., with Roberta Rosenberg Farber). Hanover: Brandeis University Press/University Press of New England, 1999.
 Tikkun Olam: Social Responsibility in Jewish Thought and Law (Co-Ed., with David Shatz and Nathan J. Diament). Northvale, NJ: Jason Aronson, 1997.
 Study Guide to accompany W. E. Thompson and J. V. Hickey, Society in Focus: An Introduction to Sociology, Second Edition. New York: HarperCollins, 1996.
 Israel as a Religious Reality (Ed.). Northvale, NJ: Jason Aronson, 1994.
 American Aliya: Portrait of an Innovative Migration Movement. Detroit, Wayne State University Press, 1989.
 America’s Jews in Transition. Philadelphia, Temple University Press, 1983.
 Ethnicity, Identity and History (Co-Ed., with Joseph B. Maier). New Brunswick, Transaction Books, 1983.
 The Stigma of Poverty: A Critique of Poverty Theories and Policies, Second Edition. New York, Pergamon Press, 1983. First Edition, New York, Pergamon Press, 1977.
 The Palestinians: People, History, Politics (Co-Ed., with Michael Curtis, Joseph Neyer, and Allen Pollack). New Brunswick, Transaction Books, 1975.
 The End of Ideology Debate (Ed.). New York, Funk and Wagnalls, 1969. Paperback Edition, New York, Simon & Schuster, 1969.
 Poverty: Power and Politics (Ed.). New York, Grosset and Dunlap, 1968. Paperback Edition, Universal Library, 1968.

References

1941 births
Living people
American sociologists
Jewish sociologists
Jewish social scientists